Pai is the northeasternmost district (amphoe) of Mae Hong Son province, northern Thailand. The central town is Pai.

Geography
The Daen Lao Range dominates the landscape of this district. Neighboring districts are (from west clockwise): Mueang Mae Hong Son, Pang Mapha of Mae Hong Son Province; Shan State of Myanmar; Wiang Haeng, Chiang Dao, Mae Taeng, Samoeng, and Galyani Vadhana of Chiang Mai province.

The main rivers in the district are the Pai and Khong Rivers.

Symbols
The district slogan is, "Pai River, worship Luang Pho Un Mueang, spread good kind of garlic, surrounded by lush forests, way of life evenly between hot and cold".

History
In the year 1477 during the King Tilokaraj's reign of Lanna Kingdom. He ordered Prince Si Chai to attack Burmese army at Ban Don. During the battle, two of his white elephants fled. He asked the soldiers to find before found that they were swimming in an unnamed river. Therefore he named this river "Pai", which comes from the name of the elephant "Chang Pai".

After winning the war. The King established him as Lord Chai Songkhram and has been in charge of Pai since then.

Administration
The district is divided into seven sub-districts (tambons), which are further subdivided into 66 villages (mubans). Pai itself has township (thesaban tambon) status and covers parts of tambon Wiang Tai. There are a further seven tambon administrative organizations (TAO).

Sights
Pai, at present it is well known as an important tourist destination of Mae Hong Son. It is therefore very popular with both Thai and foreign tourists especially young people and also being used as a location for filming movies such as Ruk Jung in 2006, Pai in Love and Kat Rattakarn's Ya Kuet Nak-MV in 2009, Timeline in 2014 etc.

Wat Si Don Chai (Luang Sa Ri Bua Ban), the first temple of Pai, older than 700 years.
Tha Pai Memorial Bridge
Wat Nam Hu
Wat Sai Khao
Mo Paeng Waterfall 
Pam Bok Waterfall
The Pai Secret Hot Springs 
Tha Pai Hot Spring
Yun Lai Viewpoint
Santichon Village, Chinese Yunan Cultural Village
Huai Nam Dang National Park (shares with Mae Taeng and Wiang Haeng Districts of Chiang Mai Province)
Pai River
Kong Lan or Pai Canyon
Pai Walking Street

References

External links

cdd.go.th  Pai History

Pai
Geography of Mae Hong Son province